John Henry Knight (21 January 1847 – 22 September 1917), from Farnham, was a wealthy engineer, landowner and inventor. With the help of the engineer George Parfitt he built one of Britain's first petrol-powered motor vehicles, Frederick Bremer of Walthamstow having built the first in 1892. On 17 October 1895, with his assistant James Pullinger, they drove through Farnham, Surrey, whereupon he was prosecuted for using a locomotive with neither a licence nor a man walking in front with a red flag. This is sometimes misreported as the first person to be convicted of speeding in the UK, but that sobriquet subsequently fell to Walter Arnold of East Peckham, Kent, in January 1896.

Knight was both an inventor and pioneer, having created a (failed) steam powered road vehicle; a renowned steam powered hop digger; a heat saving radiator; a brick laying machine; a grenade thrower, a speedometer, wooden vehicle tyres, and a patent 'dish lever' for tilting plates when carving meat.

Knight was a founder member of the Automobile Association and politically active in the repeal of the Red Flag Act, he was also a pioneer of colour photography, plus writing various factual and practical books.

Family and early life
John Henry Knight was born in 1847 to John Knight, a banker and brewer of Farnham, who died in 1856 when John Henry was 9 years old. His mother was Mary Knight. His father's will bequeathed him title to, among other things, 'The Anchor Inn, Normandy' when he was 21 years old. He  was born and raised at Weybourne House, Weybourne, Farnham, Surrey, which still stands today. He then moved to Barfield in Runfold, just outside Farnham, which is now a Preparatory school (whose alumni include Mike Hawthorn).

He was inspired by The Great Exhibition of 1851 and went on to train as an engineer, developing an early enthusiasm for steam powered road-going transport. He owned an engineering works on West Street, Farnham.

Early motoring

In 1895 Knight built one of Britain's first petrol-powered motor vehicles, a three-wheeled, two-seater contraption with a top speed of only . It was "The first petroleum carriage for two people made in England"  and believed to be the fourth British vehicle to be built plus the 'first petrol driven vehicle ever to be driven on British roads'. Known as the Trusty, it had a single cylinder Trusty 1,565cc engine.

Sources such as British Local History state that:
The car was designed very much as an experiment in order to attract police attention and therefore create public awareness of the many restrictions which prevented the use of motor carriages in Britain at that time.

On 17 October 1895 Knight's assistant, James Pullinger, was stopped in Castle Street, Farnham, by the Superintendent of Police and a crowd had gathered by the time Knight arrived. Knight was advised by his lawyer to admit liability for not having a licence for the vehicle. He and Pullinger were charged with using a locomotive without a licence. The case was heard at 'Farnham Petty Sessions' held at Farnham Town Hall on 31 October 1895. Knight and Pullinger were both fined half a crown 2s 6d (or possibly 5 shillings) plus 10 shillings costs (or possibly 12s 6d). Knight largely restricted the use of the car to farm roads until the Locomotives  Act 1865 was replaced by the Locomotives on Highways Act 1896. His action was later also responsible for the repeal of the notorious Red Flag legislation.

Knight's vehicle was said to be "almost silent" when it was running; the vehicle entered a limited production run in 1896 and shortly after that the tricycle was the only British car at the 1896 Horseless Carriage display at The Crystal Palace, although the design was later changed in favour of a four-wheel version. The car is currently on display at the National Motor Museum.

Knight was a founder member of the Automobile Club of Great Britain, so the members first ever 'club run' was hosted at his Barfield home.

Other inventions and pioneering activities

Although best remembered for his car and his driving, he had, for many years, been an inventor and a designer of steam-powered machines, which he used for agricultural work and early road transport.

Steam powered road vehicle
In 1868 he built a steam powered road vehicle, although it was not a practical proposition due to inefficiency.

Steam powered hop digging machine
In 1872 Knight developed a steam powered hop digging machine. A rival designer, Frank Proctor, stated in an 1890 edition of the weekly magazine "Engineering" that "Mr Knight has undoubtedly earned the distinction of being one of the early pioneers in the system of steam digging". He had begun developing his first digging machine in 1872, specifically for working in hopfields, which are difficult to cultivate due to the incidence of the hop poles which support the strings up which the plants climb. "Digging by Steam" by Colin Tyler (published in 1977 by Argus Books Ltd) devotes a chapter to hop digging machines, many of which were designed and built by Knight, and which are illustrated with drawings or photos.

Other inventions

His other inventions included - 
 Knight's Thermosote Heat Saving Radiator, for which patents were applied for;
 a brick laying machine; a wall that it built still stands at Barfield School in Runfold, but the machine's main flaw was an inability to turn/build corners.
 a grenade thrower,
 a speedometer, 
 wooden vehicle tyres,
 Knight's patent 'dish lever' for tilting plates when carving meat.

Photography
He was a keen photographer and pioneer of early colour photography, photographing Farnham and the surrounding countryside in the early years of the 20th century.

Writing
His publications included:
 Electric Light for Country Houses 
 Reminiscences of a Country Town 
 Notes on Motor Carriages with Hints for Purchasers and Users. Published 1896, Hazell, Watson & Viney, Ltd. London
 A Catechism of the Motor Car, Containing about 320 Questions and Answers Explaining the Construction and Working of a Modern Motor Car. For the Use of Owners, Drivers, and Students. By John Henry Knight.
 Light Motor Cars and Voiturettes, A 1902 book reflecting light cars and motoring of the time. By John Henry Knight.

Commemoration

Knight died in September 1917 and is buried in St John's churchyard in Hale, north east of Farnham in Surrey. A black plaque on the wall of the old works at West Street, Farnham commemorates John Henry Knight's achievement. It says

See also
 Frederick Bremer

Notes

References

External links
 John Henry Knight at The Museum of Farnham 
 University of Reading.  Knight (DX 313) This collection consists of 200 copy prints made by the Museum of English Rural Life from negatives loaned by Farnham Urban District Council.
 Wey River, History of Farnham, Letter from Knight's chief engineer, George Parfitt, on 28/7/1895, describing the development process and achievements for the Trusty development.

Defunct motor vehicle manufacturers of England
Three-wheeled motor vehicles
People from Farnham
1847 births
1917 deaths
British automotive pioneers